F46 may refer to:

 F46 (classification), a disabled sports handicap class for arm amputees
 BMW 2 Series Gran Tourer, an automobile
 , a Type 22 frigate of the Brazilian Navy
 Fairchild F-46, an American aircraft
 , a J-class destroyer of the Royal Navy
 , a Talwar-class frigate of the Indian Navy
 Ralph M. Hall/Rockwall Municipal Airport, in Rockwall, Texas, United States